The 1958 St Helens by-election to the House of Commons of the United Kingdom was held on 12 June 1958.  It was held due to the vacation of the seat by the incumbent Labour Member of Parliament, Sir Hartley Shawcross.  It was retained by the Labour candidate Leslie Spriggs.

Background 
St Helens had been represented in Parliament by Sir Hartley Shawcross since the 1945 United Kingdom general election. However he had become increasingly disillusioned with the Labour Party to the point where he was called by the journalist Bernard Levin "Sir Shortly Floorcross". Hartley stated he wished to vacate his seat citing disillusionment with party politics. Shawcross asked to be appointed as the Crown Steward and Bailiff of the Manor of Northstead, an office of profit under the Crown which disqualifies people from being MPs as resignation is not allowed. Shawcross was later elevated to the House of Lords as a Crossbench life peer.

Election 
Carlisle was contesting his first election for the Conservative Party. Spriggs was contesting his second election after unsuccessfully standing for North Fylde three years earlier. He was selected as the Labour Party candidate following Tom Driberg bringing media attention to the selections by alleging religious discrimination in the shortlist of candidates and Spriggs was seen as the "safe" option. As St Helens is considered a safe Labour seat, Spriggs won the election and would represent St Helens until 1983. Carlisle would later get elected as the MP for Runcorn.

References

By-elections to the Parliament of the United Kingdom in Lancashire constituencies
By-elections to the Parliament of the United Kingdom in Merseyside constituencies
St Helens by-election
St Helens by-election
1950s in Lancashire
St Helens by-election
Politics of the Metropolitan Borough of St Helens